Goetta was the World Champion Quarter Running Horse for 1964, and for a time led the list of all time money-earning Quarter Horse racehorses.

Life

Goetta was a 1961 sorrel foal, sired by Go Man Go and out of a daughter of Leo named Etta Leo. Her dam was out of a daughter of Band Play, and the third dam descended from Peter McCue

Racing career 
Goetta raced for three years, with thirty-one starts. She won twenty-two of her starts, placing second twice and was third twice. The American Quarter Horse Association (or AQHA) named her the 1964 World Champion Quarter Running Horse, as well as the 1965 Champion Quarter Running Aged Mare and the 1963 Champion Quarter Running Two Year Old Filly. Her total earnings on the track were $233,920.00 and sixty-eight racing points. Besides the Championship titles, she also was a Race Register of Merit earner with an AAAT speed rating, and an AQHA Superior Race Horse. She won the All American Futurity, among other stakes wins.

Breeding record and honors 
She produced seven foals, six of whom were race winners with two of those being stakes winners. She died in 1978 giving birth to her seventh foal.

She was inducted into the AQHA Hall of Fame in 2007.

Pedigree

Notes

References

 All Breed Pedigree Database Pedigree of Goetta retrieved on June 30, 2007
 AQHA Hall of Fame accessed on September 1, 2017
 "Hall of Fame 2007" Quarter Horse Journal March 2007 p. 42-55
 Nye, Nelson C. Great Moments in Quarter Racing History New York:Arco 1983 
 Wagoner, Dan Quarter Racing Digest: 1940 to 1976 Grapevine, Texas:Equine Research 1976

External links
 Goetta at Quarter Horse Directory
 Goetta at Quarter Horse Legends

American Quarter Horse racehorses
1961 racehorse births
1978 racehorse deaths
AQHA Hall of Fame (horses)